Legoland Florida Resort (stylized as LEGOLAND Florida Resort) is a vacation destination in Winter Haven, Florida. The resort features the Legoland Florida theme park itself, the Legoland Water Park, three on-site accommodations and a separately-ticketed on-site park based on the British children's animated series Peppa Pig that opened on February 24, 2022.

Built on the site of the former Cypress Gardens theme park, Legoland preserved the botanical gardens and re-themed the water park and select attractions and venues to reflect various Lego brands.

History
On January 15, 2010, Merlin Entertainments declared its intention to build a Legoland theme park on the site of the former Cypress Gardens theme park, which permanently ceased operations in 2009. Six days later, a news conference was held with Florida Governor Charlie Crist and park officials. The story broke a day before the press conference after an email between public officials was obtained by a local newspaper; the sale price was $22.3 million.

After a relatively short construction period (as compared to parks which were built from scratch), Legoland Florida opened on Saturday, October 15, 2011.

The park expanded by adding more lands such as The World of Chima (Jul 2013), Heartlake City (Jun 2015), and Lego Ninjago World (Jan 2017) as well as expanding itself as a resort. On November 21, 2013, LEGOLAND Florida announced they would be adding their first onsite hotel, the LEGOLAND Hotel. It opened to the public on May 15, 2015. The most recent development was the announcement of the world's first theme park area themed with The Lego Movie, which opened on March 27, 2019.

From mid-March to May 2020, as with all Legoland parks, the park was shut down due to the COVID-19 pandemic.

Attractions

Theme parks

Legoland Florida
The Legoland Florida theme park opened on October 15, 2011, The park encompasses , making it the second-largest Legoland park after Legoland Windsor in the UK.

Designed for families with children ages 2 to 12, the park has more than fifty rides, shows, attractions, restaurants, and shops, plus the original Cypress Gardens that pays homage to the park's former usage. Unlike other select Legoland attractions, children are not required for entry.

Peppa Pig Theme Park
On February 25, 2021, as part of the company's exclusive multi-territory licensing agreement with Hasbro and Entertainment One, Merlin Entertainments announced to build a 4 and a half acre Peppa Pig theme park in the resort simply titled "Peppa Pig Theme Park" for 2022. It will be the first standalone theme park based on the children's property, as well as the first second dry park and the first non-Lego related theme park to open in a Legoland Resort. Peppa Pig Theme Park is separately ticketed from the Legoland Florida park in the resort, but bundled two-day, two-park tickets to visit both parks are available.

On August 13, 2021, the six main attractions for the park were announced.

On October 13, 2021, it was confirmed that the park will open on February 24, 2022, a year after its initial announcement.

Legoland Water Park
The Legoland Water Park was initially constructed as "Splash Island", which debuted in 2005 with five rides within Cypress Gardens. Splash Island was the only water park in Polk County when it opened. After Merlin Entertainments purchased the Cypress Gardens site, Splash Island was reworked with Lego themes replacing the original Polynesian-themed attractions. The Legoland Water Park also added a sixth attraction, a toddler water play area named Duplo Splash Safari, which featured slides and fountains in a shallow pool. The park reopened under its new name on May 26, 2012.

Admission to the Water Park requires purchase of an admission ticket to the theme park. The initial extra cost for admission to the water park was $12 for ages 4 and up, aimed at visitors spending a second day at Legoland.

Accommodation

Legoland Hotel
The 152-room Legoland Hotel opened May 15, 2015,

Legoland Beach Retreat
The Legoland Beach Retreat opened on April 7, 2017, which has 166 rooms in 83 freestanding bungalows designed to resemble giant Lego sets.

Pirate Island Hotel
Pirate Island Hotel opened on June 25, 2020, after a previous delay from April 17 due to the COVID-19 pandemic. This hotel is themed to pirates.

Resort layout and attractions

Legoland Florida

More than fifty rides, shows, and attractions are featured in the park based on those at other Legoland parks. The Jungle Coaster ride from Legoland Windsor was moved to the park and renamed Lego Technic Test Track (now The Great Lego Race).

Cypress Gardens' botanical park was preserved as part of the park. Also surviving is a vast Banyan tree that was planted as a seedling in a five-gallon bucket in 1939. In addition, four attractions originally from Cypress Gardens were renovated and renamed: the Triple Hurricane wooden rollercoaster was renamed to Coastersaurus, the Okeechobee Rampage family coaster was renamed to The Dragon, and Swamp Thing, a Vekoma family inverted coaster, was renamed Flying School.  The Starliner coaster, formerly built for the Miracle Strip Amusement Park in Panama City in 1963 before being moved to Cypress Gardens in 2004, was dismantled for sale. The Island in the Sky observation tower was also retained and operated from 2011 until it was closed in 2017.

The Legoland Florida theme park has fourteen sections:

The Beginning
The Beginning features no attractions, but it has the park's main gift shops, restaurants, and administrative facilities. The Legoland Hotel is located just outside the park's entrance.

Fun Town

Heartlake City

Miniland USA

Duplo Valley

Lego Kingdoms

Land of Adventure

Lego Ninjago World

The Lego Movie World
The area occupied by The Lego Movie World was previously themed as The World of Chima.

Lego City

Lego Technic

Imagination Zone

Pirates' Cove

Cypress Gardens

Legoland Florida fully reopened the original botanical gardens from the former Cypress Gardens park in March 2014. The gardens were the initial attraction at the site, which first opened in 1936. After the theme park reopened as Legoland Florida, the Oriental Gardens and Florida Pool within Cypress Gardens remained closed while repairs and landscaping were performed. The Florida Pool, named for its shape, was originally built for the 1953 film Easy to Love, starring Esther Williams.

The gardens are owned by Polk County and were listed on the U.S. National Register of Historic Places in April 2014.

Legoland Water Park

Peppa Pig Theme Park

Former Attractions
The following are individual attractions that have closed formerly operated throughout the park's history:

 only one section of the park has closed while another has been rethemed:
The World of Chima
The World of Chima was a section based on Lego's Legends of Chima sets and was sponsored by Cartoon Network throughout the area's lifespan.  The area opened on July 3, 2013, and was the park's first new land. It was closed on May 29, 2017, and was replaced by The LEGO Movie World.

Duplo Village
Duplo Village originally opened with the park on October 15, 2011.  On October 3, 2013, it was announced that the area would be enhanced and rethemed as Duplo Valley. One attraction would be removed while the others were re-themed.

Gallery

See also

2011 in amusement parks
Bok Tower Gardens

References

External links

 
 Legoland Florida Photo Gallery

Legoland
2011 establishments in Florida
Amusement parks in Greater Orlando
Buildings and structures in Winter Haven, Florida
Tourist attractions in Polk County, Florida
Amusement parks opened in 2011